Frank Leslie Potts (May 20, 1867 - January 7, 1926) was a Canadian politician.

Personal life 
Potts was born in Saint John, New Brunswick, Canada to Joseph William Potts and Eunice Louise Battle. He was married to Elizabeth May Flemming and they had two children, Roy Flewelling Potts (1887-1974) and Gladys Leslie Potts (1888-1888). He was also the brother-in-law of the John A Monroe, who was tried and convicted of the murder of his mistress, Sarah "Maggie" Vail and their daughter, Ella May Monroe.

Career 
Potts was elected mayor of Saint John, New Brunswick, Canada in 1924 but was unable to finish his term as he died in 1926 at the age of 58. He is buried in Fernhill Cemetery in Saint John.

1867 births
1926 deaths
Mayors of Saint John, New Brunswick